Hong Kong Disneyland is a theme park located at the Hong Kong Disneyland Resort on reclaimed land in Penny's Bay, Lantau Island.

Main Street, U.S.A.

Attractions and entertainment
 Animation Academy
 Art of Animation
 Flights of Fantasy Parade
 Hong Kong Disneyland Railroad – Main Street Station
 Main Street Entertainment
 Main Street Vehicles
 Meet Chip and Dale in Main Street
 Meet Daisy at Town Square
 Meet Donald at Town Square
 Meet Duffy and Friends at Main Street Cinema
 Meet Goofy in Main Street
 Meet Mickey and Minnie at Town Square
 Meet Pluto in Main Street
 Momentous

Former attractions and entertainment
 The Disneyland Story presenting How Mickey Mouse Came to Hong Kong (2005–2008, re-themed as Art of Animation)
 The Dapper Dans (2007–2008)
 Main Street Haunted Hotel (2007–2011)
 Turtle Talk with Crush (2008)
 Mickey's House (2008–2009)
 High School Musical: LIVE! (2008–2011, re-themed as Lightning McQueen "LIVE"!)
 Tinker Bell's Pixie Dusted Castle (2010–2011)
 "The Magic Continues" Preview Gallery (2011)
 Lightning McQueen "LIVE"! (2011)
 Graves Academy (2012–2014)
 Monsters University Administration Building (2013)
 "Disney in the Stars" Fireworks (2005–2018)
 Royal Princess Garden (2017–2019)
 "Disney Paint the Night" Nighttime Spectacular (2014-2020)
 We Love Mickey (2018–2020, 2020-2022)

Fantasyland

Attractions and entertainment
 Cinderella Carousel
 Dumbo the Flying Elephant
 Fairy Tale Forest - presented by PANDORA
 Fantasy Gardens
 Hong Kong Disneyland Railroad - Fantasyland Station
 It's a Small World
 Mad Hatter Tea Cups
 The Many Adventures of Winnie the Pooh
 Meet Rapunzel at Fantasyland
 Meet Tinker Bell at Fairy Tale Forest
 Mickey and the Wondrous Book
 Mickey's PhilharMagic
 Olaf's Frozen Adventure Character Greeting
 Snow White Grotto
 Street Entertainment at Fantasyland
 Sword in the Stone
 The Royal Reception Hall
 Castle of Magical Dreams
 Royal Princess Garden

Former attractions and entertainment
 The Golden Mickeys (2005–2015)
 Sleeping Beauty Castle and Hub Area (2005–2018)

Tomorrowland

Attractions and entertainment
 Ant-Man and The Wasp: Nano Battle! (redesigned as Stark Expo)
 Hyperspace Mountain
 Heroic Encounter with Iron Man at Iron Man Tech Showcase (redesigned as Stark Expo)
 Iron Man Experience - Presented by AIA (redesigned as Stark Expo)
 Iron Man Tech Showcase - Presented by Stark Industries (redesigned as Stark Expo)
 Orbitron
 Street Entertainment at Tomorrowland

Former attractions and entertainment
 Muppet Mobile Lab (2008–2013)
 Autopia (2006–2016)
 Stitch Encounter (2006–2016; returned temporarily in 2019 at The Pavilion for an event)
 UFO Zone (2006–2016)
 Buzz Lightyear Astro Blasters (2005–2017)
 Meet Buzz Lightyear in Tomorrowland (2005–2017)
 Jedi Training: Trials of the Temple (2016–2021)
 Meet BB-8 at Star Wars: Command Post (2016–2021)
 Meet Chewbacca at Star Wars: Command Post (2016–2021)
 Meet R2-D2 at Star Wars: Command Post (2016–2021)
 Star Wars: Command Post (2016–2021)

Upcoming attractions and entertainment
 Avengers Quinjet Experience (Opening in TBD) (also parts of Stark Expo)

Adventureland

Attractions and entertainment
 Festival of the Lion King
 Jungle River Cruise
 Karibuni Marketplace
 Liki Tikis
 Meet Aladdin at Karibuni Marketplace
 Meet Baloo at Karibuni Marketplace
 Meet Carl Fredricksen at Karibuni Marketplace
 Meet Genie at Karibuni Marketplace
 Meet Judy Hopps at Karibuni Marketplace
 Meet King Louie at Karibuni Marketplace
 Meet Lilo Pelekai at Karibuni Marketplace
 Meet Nick Wilde at Karibuni Marketplace
 Meet Princess Jasmine at Karibuni Marketplace
 Meet Russell at Karibuni Marketplace
 Meet Rafiki at Karibuni Marketplace
 Meet Stitch at Karibuni Marketplace
 Meet Timon at Karibuni Marketplace
 Moana: A Homecoming Celebration, at Jungle Junction
 Rafts to Tarzan's Treehouse
 Street Entertainment at Adventureland
 Tarzan's Treehouse

Former attractions and entertainment
 Lucky the Dinosaur (2005–2006)
 Jungle Puppet Carnival (2005–2009)

Toy Story Land

Attractions and entertainment
 Barrel of Fun
 Cubot in Toy Story Land
 Meet Buzz Lightyear at Barrel of Fun
 Meet Jessie at Barrel of Fun
 Meet Woody at Barrel of Fun
 RC Racer
 Slinky Dog Spin
 Toy Soldier Boot Camp
 Toy Soldiers Parachute Drop

Grizzly Gulch

Attractions and entertainment
 Big Grizzly Mountain Runaway Mine Cars
 Geyser Gulch
 Welcome Wagon Show
 Wild West Photo Fun

Mystic Point

Attractions and entertainment
 Garden of Wonders
 Mystic Manor
 Mystic Point Freight Depot

Future areas
The following lands will open in phases beginning in 2023.

World of Frozen (Opening Date: 2023)

 Frozen Ever After (2023)
 Wandering Oaken's Sliding Sleighs (2023)
 Playhouse in the Woods (2023)

Parades and fireworks
Flights of Fantasy Parade
Follow Your Dreams 
Momentous

Former parades and fireworks
 Disney on Parade (2005–2010)
 "Disney in the Stars" Fireworks (2005–2018)
 Mickey's WaterWorks (2007–2013)
 "Disney Paint the Night" Nighttime Spectacular (2005–2020)

See also
 List of Disney attractions
 List of lands at Disney theme parks

References

Hong Kong Disneyland Resort
Disneyland